In enzymology, an acyl-[acyl-carrier-protein] desaturase is an enzyme that catalyzes the chemical reaction

stearoyl-[acyl-carrier-protein] + reduced acceptor + O2  oleoyl-[acyl-carrier-protein] + acceptor + 2 H2O

The systematic name of this enzyme class is acyl-[acyl-carrier-protein], hydrogen-donor:oxygen oxidoreductase. Other names in common use include stearyl acyl carrier protein desaturase, and stearyl-ACP desaturase.  This enzyme participates in polyunsaturated fatty acid biosynthesis.  It employs one cofactor, ferredoxin.

Reaction

The 3 substrates of this enzyme are stearoyl-(acyl-carrier-protein), reduced acceptor, and O2, whereas its 3 products are oleoyl-(acyl-carrier-protein), acceptor, and H2O.

The precise mechanism of this class of enzymes is not known, however recent studies using the kinetic isotope effect suggest that the rate limiting step is the removal of a hydrogen from the carbon nearest the carboxylic acid group. The diiron cluster moves through to a peroxo intermediate which can then dehydrate the short-lived alcohol intermediate, liberating water. There are a variety of specific enzymes within this class that attack using this mechanism, but do so at different points along the carbon chain of their respective fatty acids

Biological Function

This enzyme belongs to the family of oxidoreductases, specifically those acting on paired donors, with O2 as oxidant and incorporation or reduction of oxygen. The oxygen incorporated need not be derived from O2 with oxidation of a pair of donors resulting in the formation of H2O.

This family of enzymes is found only in the plastids of higher plant cells, unlike other desaturases such as acyl-lipid desaturases and acyl-CoA desaturases. The regiospecific role of stearoyl-ACP desaturase is to initialise multiple desaturations by acyl-lipid desaturases. Oleic acid is formed from this reaction is transported to either the thylakoid or cytoplasm to complete desaturation.

Structural studies

As a dimer, the fatty acid chain binds to a hydrophobic pocket at the interface of the two dimers,. This central channel is mirrored by binding sites for the electron donors on either side.

The stabilisation of the diiron-oxo element required to catalyse the reaction has been of particular interest. Crystallographic studies suggest that the iron groups are held in place by the desaturase using aspartate and glutamate. A structure of aspartate-X-X-histidine was found to be a common motif in several plant species. This desaturase family can be further divided by the consensus motif used to hold the iron clusters in place. Of particular note are the "soluble" desaturases, which use carboxylic acid groups, whereas it is possible for some variants to use histidines instead. The histidine rich desaturases tend to be integral membrane proteins.

Structural studies strongly suggest that the animal form of this enzyme (Stearoyl-acyl-carrier-protein desaturase) is evolutionarily divergent from the forms found in plants and fungi. This is to be expected as the roles of the enzymes are different in both. For example, in insects, the desaturase is critical in the formation of ceramide, and for complex signalling molecules (pheremones), while in fungi, the function of the enzyme, and concentration of unsaturated lipids is regulated in response to function of growth temperature by controlling membrane fluidity in cells.

Potential Industrial Relevance

This enzyme class plays a critical role in the biosynthesis of unsaturated fatty acids in plants, and are very specific to their substrates. A common theme in recent research has been to identify uncommon desaturases in various plants and isolate their genetic code. In particular, this can then be inserted into model cells (such as Escherichia coli) and up-regulated through metabolic engineering to skew the composition of oils produced by the model cells.

This becomes a particularly lucrative endeavour if it becomes possible to successfully synthesise so-called Omega-3 fatty acids or other nutraceutical products from basic saturated fatty acids, and extract them from their hosts.

References

EC 1.14.19
Enzymes of known structure